was a Japanese drummer in the Kumi odori tradition. In 2003 he was recognised as a Living National Treasure, holder of an Important Intangible Cultural Heritage. Shimabukuro was the first kumiodori performer to be accorded this accolade.

References

1920 births
2006 deaths
20th-century Japanese musicians
20th-century Japanese male musicians